Russian Film Week is an annual film festival in London founded in 2016 by Filip Perkon (Perkon Productions Ltd.) with a group of volunteers on a non-profit basis. It is currently the biggest Russian film and culture event outside of Russia. From 2017 the festival is supported by the Russian Ministry of Culture and the British Council and is aimed to promote Russian film to international audiences, stimulate European-Russian film production collaboration and build cultural links between Russia and the UK.

The festival screens both Russian and co-produced feature films, shorts, documentary and animated films. The programme of the Russian Film Week includes a number of satellite events, such as the Co-production Day (Russian: День Копродукции), master-classes by the award-winning filmmakers, round tables, lectures, exhibitions and other entertainment events for film-makers, distributors and audiences from both Russia and Europe. In 2016, the invited filmmakers included Anna Melikyan, Renata Litvinova, Alexey Uchitel, Johnny O’Reilly, Vera Glagoleva and the founder of the Raindance Film Festival Elliot Grove, who is also one of the patrons of the Russian Film Week.

The Golden Unicorn Awards ceremony concludes the festival to recognise excellence in 11 categories plus a special award and is held in the format of a Charity Gala in support of a chosen charity - in 2016 this was the Gift of Life UK. The Best Film and Best Actor awards of 2016 were given to The Student by Kirill Serebrennikov and its lead actor Pyotr Skvortsov and Renata Litvinova received the Best Actress award for her role in Anna Melikyan's film About Love.

In 2017, the Russian Film Week was held between 19 and 26 November.

The full list of winners of 2017 Russian Film Week 2017 

Best Film:
Loveless (Andrey Zvyagintsev)

Best Screenplay:
Loveless (Oleg Negin, Andrey Zvyagintsev)

Best Actor:
Aleksandr Yatsenko (Arrhythmia)

Best Actress:
Maryana Spivak (Loveless)

Young Talent:
Darya Zhovner (Closeness)

Best Short Film:
The law of excluded third (Aleksandra Sokolovskaya)

Best Documentary:
Lake Vostok (Jekaterina Yeremenko)

Best Animation:
Listening to Beethoven (Garry Bardin)

Best Film About Russia:
Lady Macbeth (William Oldroyd)

Best Foreign Documentary Film:
Oleg and the rare arts (Andres Duque)

The full list of winners of 2018 Russian Film Week  

Best Film:
How Viktor “The Garlic” Took Alexey “The Stud” to the Nursing Home. Director - Alexander Hant

Best Screenplay:
How Viktor “The Garlic” Took Alexey “The Stud” to the Nursing Home

Best Actor:
Evgeny Tkachuk (How Viktor “The Garlic” Took Alexey “The Stud” to the Nursing Home)

Best Actress:
Irina Starshenbaum (Summer)

Best Emerging Talent:
Timothy Zhalin, Director (Coupled)

Best Documentary:
INTO Nation of the Great Odessa

Best Short Film:
The sign

Best Foreign Film with a Russian connection:
Sergio & Sergei

Best Foreign Documentary Film:
A Sniper’s War

Venues 
The inaugural Russian Film Week events were held at several venues across London and at Cambridge University.

The 2018 awards ceremony took place at the Sheraton Park Lane London.

References 

Film festivals in London
Russia–United Kingdom relations